SVR may refer to:

Biology and medicine
 Systemic vascular resistance
 Sustained viral response in hepatitis C treatment

Companies and organizations
 , or in English the Foreign Intelligence Service (Russia)
 Second Vermont Republic, a US secessionist group
 Reykjavík bus company merged into Strætó bs
 SV Ried, an Austrian soccer club
 SVR Producciones, a Chilean record label
 Sons of Veterans Reserve, of the Sons of Union Veterans of the Civil War

Finance
 Scottish variable rate of income tax
 Standard variable rate for mortgages

Media 
 WWE 2K, formally WWE Smackdown VS. Raw.
 WWE Smackdown! VS. Raw (2004 video game)
 WWE SmackDown! vs. Raw 2006
 WWE SmackDown vs. Raw 2007
 WWE SmackDown vs. Raw 2008
 WWE SmackDown vs. Raw 2009
 WWE SmackDown vs. Raw 2010
 WWE SmackDown vs. Raw 2011

Technology 
 Super Video Recording in Video Cassette Recording
 UNIX System V Release
 Subvocal recognition
 Support vector regression

Transportation and vehicles
 Automotive 
 Jaguar R and SVR models of cars
 Not to be confused with: SVO (Special Vehicle Operations)
 Railway 
 Severn Valley Railway, England
 Spa Valley Railway, England
 Aerospace 
 Savissivik Heliport, Greenland

Other uses
 The SAME code for a severe thunderstorm warning
 S. V. Ranga Rao, Indian cinema actor

See also